Fayón or Faió is a municipality located in the province of Zaragoza, Aragon, Spain. According to the 2004 census (INE), the municipality has a population of 395 inhabitants.
This town is located between the Ebro and the Matarranya rivers in La Franja area; the local dialect is a variant of Catalan.

History
Historically this town and its municipal term were considered part of the Matarranya, but presently it is included in the Bajo Aragón-Caspe/Baix Aragó-Casp comarca.

During the Battle of the Ebro some of the most bloody battles in the Spanish Civil War were fought in the Auts area, about 8 km north of Faió. On 25 July 1938 the 42 division of the Spanish Republican Army successfully crossed the river in this area but was surrounded and massacred in the Auts hills by the rebels.

Traditionally Fayón was part of the Roman Catholic Diocese of Lleida. In 1955 the Cesaraugustanae et aliarum decree of the Consistorial Congregation was published and on the 2d September of the same year, Fayón, along with Mequinensa was segregated from Lleida and merged with the Archdiocese of Zaragoza.

The ancestral village was submerged by the waters of the Riba-roja Reservoir in 1967 and the present-day village was built by ENHER, the state-owned company that built the dam. After the closure of the nearby coal mines, Fayón has lost about 50% of its population.

See also
Bajo Aragón-Caspe/Baix Aragó-Casp
Matarraña/Matarranya
La Franja

References

External links 

Town Hall - Official site

Municipalities in the Province of Zaragoza